Rossaveal or Rossaveel ( or Ros a' Mhíl) is a Gaeltacht village and townland in the Connemara area of County Galway, Ireland. It is the main ferry port for the Aran Islands in Galway Bay.

The Irish name Ros an Mhíl means "peninsula (or wood) of the whale (or sea monster)". It may also mean "the wooded hill". The village is the home of the Ros a' Mhíl centre under Coláiste Chamuis, an Irish language immersion summer camp for teenagers. It is served by Bus Éireann route 424 from Galway. A ferry service to the Aran Islands runs from the harbour.

Irish language

As of the 2011 census, there were 208 people living in Ros an Mhíl townland, with 73% of these speaking Irish daily.

See also
List of towns and villages in Ireland

References

Gaeltacht places in County Galway
Towns and villages in County Galway
Gaeltacht towns and villages
Articles on towns and villages in Ireland possibly missing Irish place names